Héctor "Joto" Velásquez Vergara (9 February 1952 – 18 August 2010) was a boxer from Chile. He represented his native country at the 1972 Summer Olympics in Munich, West Germany.

Velásquez won the silver medal in the Men's Light-Flyweight division (– 47 kg) at the 1971 Pan American Games, where the weight division was included for the first time. In the final, he was defeated by Cuba's Rafael Carbonell.

References
 Héctor Velásquez's profile at Sports Reference.com
 Héctor Velásquez's obituary

External links

1952 births
2010 deaths
Flyweight boxers
Olympic boxers of Chile
Boxers at the 1972 Summer Olympics
Chilean male boxers
Boxers at the 1971 Pan American Games
Pan American Games silver medalists for Chile
Pan American Games medalists in boxing
Medalists at the 1971 Pan American Games
20th-century Chilean people
21st-century Chilean people